Pallekele International Cricket Stadium, is a cricket stadium in Kandy, Sri Lanka. In July 2010, The Central Provincial Council in Kandy announced plans to rename the stadium to honour the legendary Sri Lankan cricketer Muttiah Muralitharan, but hasn't officially done so yet. The stadium was opened on 27 November 2009 and became the 104th Test venue in the world in December 2010.

Location and background
The stadium is located about a half-hour drive east of Kandy. The stadium is wholly owned by Sri Lanka Cricket and has a capacity of 35,000.

History
The stadium was built for the 2011 Cricket World Cup along with Hambantota International Cricket Stadium. The first Test match on this stadium between Sri Lanka and the West Indies was played from 1 to 5 December 2010. The first One Day International match at the venue was played between New Zealand and Pakistan on 8 March 2011. Pallekele is also the host for the Kandurata cricket team.

On 21 September 2011, it was announced that the Pallekele International Cricket stadium would host nine 2012 ICC World Twenty20 matches.

Notable events
 Tillakaratne Dilshan and Upul Tharanga added a 282 run partnership for the first wicket against Zimbabwe on 26 March 2011. This is the highest partnership for the first wicket in a Cricket World Cup match.
 By dismissing Chris Gayle of West Indies, Sri Lanka's Suranga Lakmal became the third bowler to take a wicket with the first ball bowled in a Test match at a new venue, joining Kapil Dev of India and Imran Khan of Pakistan.
 Shaun Marsh and Mike Hussey added 258 runs for the 4th wicket, the highest fourth wicket partnership in Sri Lanka vs Australia test matches.
 Tillakaratne Dilshan scored a Twenty20 International century against Australia, becoming the second Sri Lankan to score centuries in all formats. This is the highest individual innings by a Sri Lankan in T20Is, and made Dilshan the first ever cricketer to score centuries in all formats as a captain.
 Highest individual Test score at the venue is 176 scored by Kusal Mendis against Australia in 2016.
 While attempting to bat time for a draw on the fifth day, the ninth and tenth-wicket partnerships featuring Steve O'Keefe, Peter Nevill and Josh Hazlewood (Aus) faced a Test cricket record 25.4 consecutive overs without scoring a run.
Bowling figures of 7/107 by Lakshan Sandakan in the match is the best by a slow left-arm wrist-spin bowler on Test debut.
 Pallekele has witnessed 3 Twenty20 International centuries, most at any venue - Dilshan (104), McCullum (123) and Maxwell (145).
 On 7 September 2016, Australia recorded the Highest Twenty20 International total ever by scoring 263/3 against Sri Lanka, who previously held the record (260/6).
 On 14 August 2017, India defeated Sri Lanka by an innings and 171 runs and with that, India whitewashed Sri Lanka for the first time in Tests.
 On 6 September 2019 against New Zealand, Lasith Malinga took four-in-four wickets in T20Is. It was his second four-in-four in international formats. He also took his 100th wicket in T20Is in the same match, becoming the first cricketer to take 100 wickets in all three formats.

Ground Figures

Key

 P Matches Played
 H Matches Won by Home Side
 T Matches Won by Touring Side
 N Matches Won by Neutral Side
D/N/T Matches Drawn/No Result/Tied

Updated 6 September 2018

2011 Cricket World Cup

The following 2011 Cricket World Cup matches were played in Pallekele International Cricket Stadium. The first official international match was between Pakistan and New Zealand on 8 March 2011. A total of three matches were played at the venue during the 2011 World Cup.

2012 ICC World Twenty20

Sri Lanka hosted the 2012 ICC World Twenty20. Nine matches were played in Pallekele International Cricket Stadium.

Group matches

Super 8s

See also
 List of international cricket grounds in Sri Lanka

References

External links

 Cricinfo profile on Pallekele

Cricket grounds in Sri Lanka
Test cricket grounds in Sri Lanka
Sports venues in Central Province, Sri Lanka
2009 establishments in Sri Lanka
2011 Cricket World Cup stadiums